René Anthony Rougeau (born March 25, 1986) is an American professional basketball player for Helsinki Seagulls of the Korisliiga. He played college basketball for the University of Nevada, Las Vegas where he starred in his four seasons with the Runnin' Rebels.

Professional career

Early years (2009–2010)
Following graduating from UNLV, Rougeau joined the Nevada Pride of the International Basketball League before going undrafted in the 2009 NBA draft. He then joined the Clayton Showtime of the American Basketball Association in December 2009.

On February 12, 2010, Rougeau signed with the Southland Sharks for the 2010 New Zealand NBL season. He went on to be named in the All-Star Five after averaging 16.2 points, 9.2 rebounds, 2.1 assists, 3.7 steals and 1.5 blocks in 19 games.

Mexico (2010–2014)
Following a promising first outing with the Sharks, Rougeau moved to Mexico where he began what would end up being a four-year stint in the country. From 2010 to 2014, he played for Toros de Nuevo Laredo of the Liga Nacional de Baloncesto Profesional where he won two championships (2011 and 2013) and earned two All-Star nods (2012 and 2014). He also played for Caballeros de Culiacán of the CIBACOPA during the 2011, 2012 and 2014 LNBP off-seasons. He also played for Mineros de Cananea of the CIBACOPA and the Venice Beach Warriors of the WCBL in 2013, and for Bucaneros de La Guaira of Venezuela in 2014.

Israel (2014–2016)
On July 3, 2014, Rougeau signed a two-year deal with Maccabi Haifa of the Israeli Basketball Premier League.

Later career (2016–present)
Rougeau signed in Finland with Kauhajoen Karhu in 2017. During the 2018-19 season, he averaged 15.8 points, 8.0 rebounds, 3.5 assists, 1.8 steals and 1.5 blocks per game, and was named the league's Foreign MVP. In July 2019, Rougeau signed with Hermine Nantes Basket of the French LNB Pro B. After earning Eurobasket.com All-French ProB 2nd Team honors, he re-signed with the team on June 8, 2020.

Personal
Rougeau is a devout Christian. He reads the Bible in the locker room before every game.

References

External links
UNLV bio
Eurobasket.com profile
RealGM profile

1986 births
Living people
African-American basketball players
American expatriate basketball people in Finland
American expatriate basketball people in France
American expatriate basketball people in Israel
American expatriate basketball people in Mexico
American expatriate basketball people in New Zealand
American expatriate basketball people in Venezuela
American men's basketball players
Basketball players from Sacramento, California
Caballeros de Culiacán players
Hermine Nantes Basket players
Kauhajoen Karhu players
Maccabi Haifa B.C. players
People from Rancho Cucamonga, California
Shooting guards
Small forwards
Southland Sharks players
Sportspeople from San Bernardino County, California
Toros de Nuevo Laredo players
UNLV Runnin' Rebels basketball players
21st-century African-American sportspeople
20th-century African-American people